School District 35 Langley is a school district in British Columbia.  This includes the municipalities of Langley Township and Langley City.

History
The Langley School District is one of the earliest school districts in British Columbia. It was established on April 30, 1871 prior to British Columbia becoming part of Canada. The first teacher appointed to the Langley School board by the Province of British Columbia was Mr. William W. Gibbs on June 21, 1872. There were 30 students in the district that year.

In September 1905, grades 9 and 10 were taught in the district for the first time when a room was rented at the Billy Murray Hotel for 23 students. The District's first permanent secondary school, Langley High School, was opened September, 1924. After 1948, the school was converted into Langley Central Elementary School, which continued to operate until it burned down in 1993. In December 2011, Royal Canadian Mounted Police Superintendent Derek Cooke announced that charges of sexual interference and sexual assault had been laid against a 57-year-old female teacher in the school district.

Langley Schools Music Project
The school district gained some fame in 2001 with the re-release of The Langley Schools Music Project, a collection of children's chorus recordings made from 1976–77 by Canadian music teacher Hans Fenger in the Glenwood Elementary School gymnasium. The students from Glenwood, South Carvolth, Lochiel and Wix-Brown performed unique versions of pop hits by the likes of The Beach Boys, David Bowie, and Paul McCartney. The recordings were quickly forgotten until Irwin Chusid, a DJ on the New Jersey radio station WFMU rediscovered them in 2000. He managed to get them released on Bar/None Records, and they immediately created an international buzz, making many end-of-the-year best album lists in 2001. VH-1 orchestrated a reunion of the students and their teacher in 2002, and aired a documentary as well.

Elementary schools 
Aldergrove Elementary School (now closed)
 Alex Hope Elementary School – named after Alexander Campbell Hope, a former member of the British Columbia assembly
 Alice Brown Elementary School
Belmont Elementary School
Blacklock Elementary School (Fine Arts)
Bradshaw Elementary School (now closed) – a former bilingual public elementary school. Named after H. Bradshaw, a respected magistrate of the 1930s, Bradshaw Elementary was built in 1973 on what had been a strawberry field bounded by Anderson Creek. On Thursday, June 28, 2007 Bradshaw dismissed the students for the last time due to successive years of low enrollment.
Coghlan Elementary School
County Line Elementary School (now closed)
 Dorothy Peacock Elementary School is a public school in Langley, British Columbia. It was founded in 1998. The school serves students in grades kindergarten–7.
Douglas Park Community Elementary School
 Fort Langley Elementary School
Glenwood Elementary School
Gordon Greenwood Elementary School
James Hill Elementary School
James Kennedy Elementary School
Langley Fundamental Elementary School (K-5)
Langley Meadows Elementary School
Murrayville Elementary School (now closed)
Lochiel (U-Connect) Elementary School – formerly a K–3 French immersion elementary school, closed in June 2001. Now open as a distance learning centre.
Lynn Fripps Elementary School
Nicomekl Elementary School
Noel Booth Elementary School
North Otter Elementary School
Parkside Centennial Elementary School
Peterson Road Elementary School
RC Garnett Elementary School (Demonstration School K–5)
Richard Bulpitt Elementary School
Shortreed Elementary School
Simonds Elementary School
South Carvolth Environmental Elementary School (now closed) – located within the boundaries of Campbell Valley Park
Topham Elementary School
 Uplands Elementary School / Uplands Montessori
West Langley Elementary School
Willoughby Elementary School
Wix-Brown Elementary School

Middle schools 
Langley Fundamental Middle School (Grades 6–8, shares a campus with the Secondary School)
H.D. Stafford Middle School (Grades 6–8)
Betty Gilbert Middle School  (Grades 6–8)
Yorkson Creek Middle School (Grades 6–8)
Peter Ewart Middle School (Grades 6-8)

Secondary schools 
Aldergrove Community Secondary School  
Brookswood Secondary School  
D.W. Poppy Secondary School 
Langley Secondary School  
Langley Fundamental Secondary School (9–12, shares a campus with Langley Fundamental Middle School)
R.E. Mountain Secondary School  
Walnut Grove Secondary School

Other 
Langley Education Centre  
Langley Fine Arts School (Grades 1–12)

See also 
List of school districts in British Columbia

References

External links 
 History of Langley School District

 
35
Lower Mainland